Shafaullah Khan Rokhri (1966 - 29 August 2020) was a Saraiki folk singer, songwriter and music producer. He mainly sang Saraiki and Punjabi songs which are popular all over Pakistan. He along with his son Zeeshan Khan Rokhri produced music under their own label Rokhri Productions. His son Zeeshan Khan Rokhri is also a famous Saraiki singer.

Shafaullah Rokhri is considered a legend of Saraiki music and was the most popular singer from the Saraiki belt second to Ataullah Khan Esakhelvi.

Early life 
Rokhri was born in 1966 in Mianwali, Punjab, he initially joined Punjab Police as a constable but due to his interest in music left the job to pursue career in music.

Music career 
Rokhri started his music career in the era of 1980s and soon rose to fame among Saraiki folks. He released a number of albums and became a prolific singer of the Saraiki folk genre over the years and was considered only second to Ataullah Khan Esakhelvi, also from Mianwali.

His son Zeeshan Rokhri in later years also joined him and the father-son duo sang manly songs which became immensely popular among folks in Pakistan. They also produced a music show named Folk Studio under their own music label Rokhri Productions which featured their own songs along with other artists from Saraiki belt.

During last decade they mostly revamped their own songs and released them on YouTube under Rokhri Productions which were quite popular in Pakistan and garnered millions of views. His songs are also being sung by a number of new singers who rose to fame singing and following his style.

Personal life 
He was married and had a daughter and four sons. His son Zeeshan Khan Rokhri is also a famous Saraiki singer.

Death
Rokhri died on 29 August 2020 in Islamabad due to cardiac arrest.  Chief Minister Punjab Usman Buzdar expressed condolences to Rokri's family on his demise and said that it closed the chapter of Saraiki music and his services will long be remembered.

References

15. Zeeshan Rokhri Biography "Zeeshan Rokhri Wife, Biography, Age, Family" He is the son of Shafaullah Rokhri

2020 deaths
Pakistani folk singers
People from Mianwali District
21st-century Pakistani male singers
1966 births